Dalian Longjuanfeng Football Club is an amateur Chinese football club that currently participates in the China Amateur Football League. The team is based in Dalian, Liaoning.

History
Dalian Longjuanfeng F.C. was established in 2004. It first entered the final stage of China Amateur Football League in 2011 and was crowned as champions.

After finishing 5th in the 2015 China Amateur Football League season, the club sold their place in the 2016 China Amateur Football League and entire first-team to Dalian Boyang.

The following 2017 season saw the club rebuilt itself with a team assembled from their former reserve squad and managed to reach 9th place in the 2017 China Amateur Football League national finals.

Results
All-time league rankings

As of the end of 2017 season.

Key
 Pld = Played
 W = Games won
 D = Games drawn
 L = Games lost
 F = Goals for
 A = Goals against
 Pts = Points
 Pos = Final position

 DNQ = Did not qualify
 DNE = Did not enter
 NH = Not Held
 – = Does Not Exist
 R1 = Round 1
 R2 = Round 2
 R3 = Round 3
 R4 = Round 4

 F = Final
 SF = Semi-finals
 QF = Quarter-finals
 R16 = Round of 16
 Group = Group stage
 GS2 = Second Group stage
 QR1 = First Qualifying Round
 QR2 = Second Qualifying Round
 QR3 = Third Qualifying Round

Honours
China Amateur Football League: 2011

References

Football clubs in China
Association football clubs established in 2004
Sport in Dalian
2004 establishments in China

Football clubs in Liaoning